Gwalichaur is a village development committee in Baglung District in the Dhawalagiri Zone of central Nepal. At the time of the 1991 Nepal census it had a population of 3,907 and had 699 houses in the town.

References

Populated places in Baglung District